Chan Siu Yuk (born 21 December 1955) is an archer from Hong Kong.

Archery

She finished sixtieth at the 1988 Summer Olympic Games in the women's individual event with 1098 points.

References

External links 
 Profile on worldarchery.org

1955 births
Living people
Hong Kong female archers
Olympic archers of Hong Kong
Archers at the 1988 Summer Olympics